Sydney Payne (born September 16, 1997) is a Canadian rower. Payne's hometown is Toronto, Ontario.

Career
Payne is a two time U-23 World Champion in the women's eights boat, in 2017 and 2018. Later in 2018, Payne helped the senior women's eights boat to a silver at the World Championships. In 2019, Payne was part of the coxless four boat, finishing in eighth at the World Championships and qualifying Canada the boat for the 2020 Summer Olympics.

In June 2021, Payne was named to Canada's 2020 Olympic team in the women's eights boat. At the Olympics, the boat won the gold medal, Canada's first in the event since 1992.

References

External links

1997 births
Canadian female rowers
Living people
Rowers from Toronto
Rowers from Victoria, British Columbia
Rowers at the 2020 Summer Olympics
Medalists at the 2020 Summer Olympics
Olympic medalists in rowing
Olympic gold medalists for Canada
21st-century Canadian women
World Rowing Championships medalists for Canada